Ulak Island is an island in the Delarof Islands subgroup of the Andreanof Islands in the Aleutian Islands chain of Alaska.

References

External links
  B. A. Drummond, B. A. und A. L. Larned: Biological monitoring in the central Aleutian Islands, Alaska in 2007: summary appendices.  U.S. Fish and Wildlife Service Report AMNWR 07/06. Homer, Alaska, 2007

Delarof Islands
Islands of Alaska
Islands of Unorganized Borough, Alaska